Viola Canady (November 3, 1922 – March 21, 2009) was an African American quiltmaker. She was the co-founder of the Daughters of Dorcas and Sons Quilting Guild of Washington, D.C..

Biography 
Viola Canady was born on November 3, 1922 to Charlie Williams and Lillie Grady. She grew up in Goldsboro, North Carolina. before moving to Washington, D.C. in 1945. In 1960, she began to work as a tailor for the US Army sewing uniforms, most notably working on the uniform of General Douglas MacArthur. In 1979, she retired before co-founding the Daughters of Dorcas and Sons Quilting Guild in 1980.

Daughters of Dorcas and Sons Quilting Guild 
The Daughters of Dorcas and Sons Quilting Guild was a group of amateur quilt-makers who were primarily African-American. They met weekly at church where Viola and fellow members would teach their mastery in quilting to members of their community. Within the guild, Viola was an influential organizer, teaching quilting and crafting techniques to her peers and local school children. She was well known for her Jewel-toned quilts, particularly her Cathedral Window quilt in the Anacostia Community Museum. Her works are also included in the collection of the DC Commission on the Arts and Humanities.

See also
 African-American art
 History of quilting

References

External links 
DC Commission for the Arts & Humanities, Viola Canady
Cathedral Window Quilt

1922 births
2009 deaths
American textile artists
American quilters
African-American women artists
Women textile artists
20th-century American women artists
Wikipedia Student Program